Hemiscopis lophopedalis is a moth in the family Crambidae. It was described by Joseph de Joannis in 1927. It is found in Mozambique.

References

Endemic fauna of Mozambique
Moths described in 1927
Odontiinae